Cine5 was the first subscription-based television channel in Turkey. It aired in an encrypted format and primarily broadcast feature-length movies when it was founded on September 20, 1993. Subscribers were required to buy a decoder to watch the channel. The number of subscribers reached over half a million. However, in recent years, it enlarged its program spectrum due to competition from other movie-based channels and removed encryption and the subscription policy on January 16, 2006. On February 15, 2011, the channel was put up for sale and bought by Al Jazeera to launch Al Jazeera Türk.

Programmes 
 32. Gün-Mehmet Ali Birand
 Çarkıfelek-Yıldo
 Turkish Super League-Erman Toroğlu
 Arena-Uğur Dündar

References

External links 

Cine5 Live 
Cine5 at LyngSat Address

Defunct television channels in Turkey
Television channels and stations established in 1993
Television channels and stations disestablished in 2015
Beşiktaş